Mariemont High School is a public high school located in Mariemont, a suburb of Cincinnati, Ohio. It is the only high school in the Mariemont City School District. Mariemont High School is known for its high academic standards, and it has been named a Blue Ribbon School of Excellence four separate times: 1984-85, 1988–89, 2001–02, 2004-05. The school was the first to receive this award four times in the state of Ohio and the fourth nationwide.

History
The school was originally housed in the building that now holds Mariemont Elementary School. In 1970, a new school was constructed, designed by architects Baxter, Hodell, Donnelly and Preston. A large portion of the building featured an open, modular design with hexagonal "pods" with department offices in the center. The pods had no walls or clearly defined borders between classrooms, no hallways, and no windows in class areas. Each pod was described to be equivalent to six standard classrooms. Students were relatively free to move about within the pods. Subjects requiring seclusion, such as music, were in more traditional classrooms.

The open design was soon found to make it difficult for students, with one staff member estimating that 20% of students could not function in the open, self-directed environment. Within a few years, bookcases and partitions were used to break up the pods into classroom-like areas, but in many cases it was still possible to hear adjacent classes.

In the 2018 midterm elections, the district passed a levy to renovate half of the school and completely rebuild the other.

Extra curricular

Music
Band
Concert Orchestra
Chamber Orchestra
Concert Choir
Chamber Choir
Showstoppers (After-school a capella group)

Latin Club
Mariemont High School's Latin Club functions as a local chapter of both the Ohio Junior Classical League (OJCL) and National Junior Classical League (NJCL). In 2018, the freshmen Certamen team won the state championships at the intermediate level.

Newspaper
The Mariemont Blueprint (Formerly The Warpath) is Mariemont High School's student newspaper. Students enrolled in the MHS Journalism Class write articles for the paper.

Sports
Mariemont is member of the Cincinnati Hills League (CHL). The league consists of other small schools from the suburbs of Cincinnati. Mariemont offers 24 varsity sports.

Ohio High School Athletic Association State Championships
Boys Soccer- 2020
Girls Lacrosse - 2018, 2021, 2022
Boys Lacrosse- 2007, 2013, 2014, 2017, 2021
 Boys Basketball - 1953 
 Boys Track and Field* - 1949
 Boys Baseball* - 1945
 * Titles won by Plainville High School prior to consolidation into Mariemont.

Notable alumni
Karl G. Henize '45* - NASA Astronaut and Astronomical Scientist 
 * Did not graduate due to enlistment in U.S Navy
Patricia Villegas '87 – Dominican Republic Ambassador to Brazil 
Mark Lippert '91 - US Ambassador to South Korea 
Erik Swanson '12 - Major League Baseball pitcher
Nick Thoman '04 - US Swim and Dive Team Member, Olympic Silver Medalist

References

External links
 Aerial image of the school and proposed changes, showing the "pod" design

High schools in Hamilton County, Ohio
Public high schools in Ohio